Return I Dare Not is a 1931 novel by the British writer Margaret Kennedy. It was her fifth novel. Although it sold well, it did not match the success of The Constant Nymph and its sequel The Fool of the Family

Synopsis
Hugo Potts, a successful London playwright, is feted by critics and the public and at the centre of social whirl. However works night and day to keep up the personae they expect of him. During a event-packed weekend at a country house he is able to gain a greater sense of himself.

References

Bibliography
 Ousby, Ian. The Cambridge Paperback Guide to Literature in English. Cambridge University Press, 1996.
 Sponenberg, Ashlie. Encyclopedia of British Women’s Writing 1900–1950. Springer, 2006.
 Vinson, James. Twentieth-Century Romance and Gothic Writers. Macmillan, 1982.

1931 British novels
Novels by Margaret Kennedy
Novels set in London
Heinemann (publisher) books
Doubleday, Doran books